Nõmmeveski is a village in Kuusalu Parish, Harju County in northern Estonia, on the territory of Lahemaa National Park. It lies on the Valgejõgi River, where a  waterfall is situated.

References

Villages in Harju County